Christine Ernst is an American former rower. She was in 1986 World Rowing Championships and won gold in the women's lightweight doubles event. She led protest a 1976 at Yale University about the inadequate facilities provided to the women's crew—the first such challenge under Title IX.

Early life 
Ernst was born in Cambridge, Massachusetts. Her family moved to Scituate, Massachusetts when she was a young child. She trained in gymnastics where she challenged, and beat, the boys in her high school in arm wrestling matches in order to get use of the equipment. 

She attended Yale University, receiving an undergraduate degree in 1976.

Rowing 
Ernst began rowing her sophomore year in college, and by her senior year she was captain of the women's crew (rowing team). However, there was no locker room available for the women's team, so they had to wait on the bus after practice while the men showered before they could return to campus.

Ernst led a protest regarding the discrepancy in facilities for the women's crew compared to the men's team. In early 1976, the nineteen members of the Yale women's crew wrote "TITLE IX" on their bodies and went into athletic director Joni Barnett's office and took off their clothes, and then Ernst read a statement about the way they were being treated that began, "These are the bodies Yale is exploiting…" This protest was noted by newspapers around the world, including The New York Times.  By 1977, a women's locker room was added to Yale's boathouse. 

After graduating from college, she was an assistant rowing coach at Yale and shifted her focus to sculling, rowing with two oars. She was an alternate on the United States Olympic team for the 1976 Summer Olympics, the first year where women's rowing was an option. She also participated as an alternate in the 1984 Summer Olympics. In 1986 she won the world championship in lightweight double sculls competing with Carrey Beth Sands, the first time the United States won a gold medal in the event. In 1988 Ernst refused to participate in the 1988 Summer Olympics because of her opposition to the political situation regarding South Korea.

Subsequent years 
In 1980, Ernst was the first woman to become a unionized plumber in New Haven; as of 1982 she was one of four female plumbers in southern Connecticut. As of 2012 she owns a plumbing company, Pipelines, in Roslindale, Massachusetts.

In 1999, Mary Mazzio produced a documentary titled A Hero For Daisy which portrays Ernst, her rowing career, and her role in the 1976 protest at Yale.

In 2012, Ernst was honored at New England Sports Museum’s “The Tradition" in honor of her role in leading the Yale protest.

References

Further reading 

Year of birth missing (living people)
Living people
Yale Bulldogs rowers
American female rowers
World Rowing Championships medalists for the United States
Pan American Games medalists in rowing
Pan American Games gold medalists for the United States
Rowers at the 1983 Pan American Games
21st-century American women
Sportspeople from Massachusetts
Women's rights activists